Volodar Zvyozdkin (born 26 April 1927) is a Soviet sprint canoer who competed in the late 1950s. He won a bronze medal in the K-4 10000 m event at the 1958 ICF Canoe Sprint World Championships in Prague.

References

External links
Profile at Sport-strana.ru 
Звездкину Володар Захаровичу исполнилось 93 года 

Living people
1927 births
Soviet male canoeists
Russian male canoeists
ICF Canoe Sprint World Championships medalists in kayak